Calling All Crooks is a 1938 British comedy film directed by George Black and starring Douglas Wakefield, Billy Nelson and Leslie Perrins. It was made by the Manchester-based Mancunian Film, but shot at Cricklewood Studios in London.

Cast
 Douglas Wakefield as Duggie  
 Billy Nelson as Billy  
 Leslie Perrins as Duvane  
 Helen Barnes as Joan Bellamy  
 Chuck O'Neil as Chuck  
 Jack Butler as Jack  
 Dan Young as Dan

References

Bibliography
 Low, Rachael. Filmmaking in 1930s Britain. George Allen & Unwin, 1985.
 Wood, Linda. British Films, 1927-1939. British Film Institute, 1986.

External links

1938 films
British comedy films
British black-and-white films
1938 comedy films
Films directed by George Black
Films shot at Cricklewood Studios
Films set in England
Films shot in Greater Manchester
1930s English-language films
1930s British films